Shelagh may refer to:

 Shelagh Alexander (1959–2018), Canadian artist known for her photographic works
 Shelagh Armstrong (born 1961), Canadian illustrator
 Shelagh Burrow (born 1950), English diver
 Shelagh Delaney (1939–2011), British playwright
 Shelagh Fogarty (born 1966), British radio and television presenter and journalist
 Shelagh Fraser (1922–2000), British actress
 Shelagh McDonald (born 1948), Scottish folk singer, songwriter and guitarist
 Shelagh McLeod (born 1960), British-based Canadian film and television actress and director
 Shelagh Rogers (born 1956), Canadian radio broadcaster
 Shelagh Stephenson, British playwright

See also 
 Shelah (disambiguation)
 Shela (disambiguation)
 Sheila